Unequal leg length (also termed leg length inequality, LLI or leg length discrepancy, LLD) is where the legs are either different lengths or appear to be different lengths because of misalignment.

Classification
There are two main types of leg length inequalities:

 Structural differences are caused by the legs themselves being measurably different in length, usually due to differences in the length of the femur in the thigh or the tibia and fibula bones in the lower leg.  This may be a birth defect or it may occur after a broken leg, serious infection, or local damage to one of the growth plates in a leg. 
 The other, more common, type is seen when the legs themselves are the same length, but due to neuromuscular injuries in the pelvis or upper leg, one leg or hip is held higher and tighter than the other (hypertonicity in the musculature of the pelvis or leg).  These unequally tightened muscles cause the legs to seem to be different lengths, even though careful measurement would show equal lengths of the actual leg.  This is called leg length alignment asymmetry (LLAA) and can be seen while lying down.

Diagnosis and workup

Unequal leg length in children is frequently first suspected by parents noticing a limp that appears to be getting worse. The standard workup in children is a thorough physical examination, including observing the child while walking and running. Also, at least in United States, standard workup in children also includes X-rays to quantify actual length of the bones of the legs.

On X-rays, there is generally measurement of both the femur and the tibia, as well as both combined. Various measuring points for these have been suggested, but a functional method is to measure the distances between joint surfaces:
Femur length: The superior aspect of the femoral head and the distal portion of the medial femoral condyle.
Tibial length: The medial tibial plateau and the tibial plafond

A leg length difference can result from a pelvic torsion.

Abnormal (gravity drive) pronation will drive the innominate bones forward (anteriorly).  The forward rotation of the innominate will shorten the leg (See Rothbart 2006).  The more pronated foot will have the more forwardly rotated innominate bone.  And will be the side with the functionally short leg.

In adults, leg length discrepancy is believed to cause low back pain as a result of increased pelvic obliquity and lumbar scoliosis.

Treatment
The most common treatment for discrepancies in leg length is the use of a simple heel lift, which can be placed within the shoe. In cases where the length discrepancy is moderate, an external build up to the shoe is usually more comfortable. In severe cases, surgery can be used to make the longer leg shorter (or impede its growth), and/or make the shorter leg longer via limb lengthening.

Measurement challenges
Although prone "functional leg length" is a widely used chiropractic tool in their Activator technique, it is not a recognized anthropometric technique, since legs are usually of unequal length, and measurements in the prone position are not entirely valid estimates of standing X-ray differences. Measurements in the standing position are far more reliable. Another confounding factor is that simply moving the two legs held together and leaning them imperceptibly to one side or the other produces different results.

Clinical measurement of leg length conventionally uses the distance from the anterior superior iliac spine to the medial malleolus. Projectional radiographic measurements of leg length have two main variants:
Teleroentgenogram, which projects the entirety of both legs at the same time.
Orthoroentgenogram, which takes separate images of the hip, knee and ankle. 
On X-rays, the length of the lower limb can be measured from the proximal end of femoral head to the center of the plafond of the distal tibia.

See also

Logan v. Zimmerman Brush Co., lawsuit over alleged job discrimination over LLI that reached the U.S. Supreme Court

References 

Rothbart BA 2006. Relationship of Functional Leg-Length Discrepancy to Abnormal Pronation. Journal American Podiatric Medical Association;96(6):499-507

External links 

Musculoskeletal disorders